Francisco de Guruceaga Iturriza (January 28, 1928 – February 10, 2012) was the Roman Catholic bishop of the Roman Catholic Diocese of La Guaira, Venezuela.

Ordained to the priesthood in 1960, de Guruceaga Iturriza became a bishop in 1967, resigning the see of La Guaira in 2001.

Notes

1928 births
2012 deaths
20th-century Roman Catholic bishops in Venezuela
Roman Catholic bishops of Margarita
Roman Catholic bishops of La Guaira
Roman Catholic bishops of Ciudad Bolívar